Andrei Trifan is a former Moldovan footballer who played as a midfielder.

Football career
On 25 April 2015, Andrei Trifan made his professional debut with Zimbru Chișinău in a 2014–15 Moldovan National Division match against Dinamo Auto.

References

External links

Notes

1996 births
Living people
Moldovan footballers
FC Zimbru Chișinău players
Place of birth missing (living people)
CS Petrocub Hîncești players
Association football midfielders